California Democratic Party v. Jones, 530 U.S. 567 (2000), was a case in which the United States Supreme Court held that California's blanket primary violates a political party's First Amendment freedom of association.

Prior history
In California, candidates for public office could gain access to the general ballot by winning a qualified political party's primary. In 1996, voter-approved Proposition 198 changed California's partisan primary from a closed primary, in which only a political party's members can vote on its nominees, to a blanket primary, in which each voter's ballot lists every candidate regardless of party affiliation and allows the voter to choose freely among them. The candidate of each party who wins the most votes is that party's nominee for the general election.  A blanket primary differs from an open primary in that in an open primary, even though voters are not required to declare party affiliation and are given a ballot listing all candidates of all parties, the voter is restricted to voting for the candidates of only one party for all races on the ballot.  In a blanket primary, the voter is free to cross party lines from one race to the next.  The California Democratic Party, the California Republican Party, the Libertarian Party of California, and the Peace and Freedom Party have historically prohibited nonmembers from voting in their party's primary. Each political party filed suit against Bill Jones, the California Secretary of State, alleging that the blanket primary violated their First Amendment right of association. Jones countered that a blanket primary will intensify the election and allow for better representation in elected office. Siding with Jones, District Judge David F. Levi held that the primary's burden on the parties' associational rights was not severe and was justified by substantial state interests. The Court of Appeals affirmed.

Supreme Court
California Democratic Party v. Jones presented the following question: Does California's voter-approved Proposition 198, which changes its partisan primary from a closed primary to a blanket primary, violate political parties' First Amendment right of association?

In a 7-2 opinion delivered by Justice Antonin Scalia, the Court held that California's blanket primary violated a political party's First Amendment right of association. "Proposition 198 forces political parties to associate with—to have their nominees, and hence their positions, determined by—those who, at best, have refused to affiliate with the party, and, at worst, have expressly affiliated with a rival," wrote Justice Antonin Scalia for the majority. "A single election in which the party nominee is selected by nonparty members could be enough to destroy the party." Justice Scalia went on to state for the Court that Proposition 198 takes away a party's "basic function" to choose its own leaders and is functionally "both severe and unnecessary."

Justices John Paul Stevens and Ruth Bader Ginsburg dissented. Stevens wrote: "This Court's willingness to invalidate the primary schemes of 3 States and cast serious constitutional doubt on the schemes of 29 others at the parties' behest is an extraordinary intrusion into the complex and changing election laws of the States."

See also
 List of United States Supreme Court cases, volume 530
 List of United States Supreme Court cases
 Lists of United States Supreme Court cases by volume
 Nonpartisan blanket primary

References

External links
 
 
  Washington State Grange v. Washington State Republican Party

United States Supreme Court cases
United States presidential primaries
United States elections case law
2000 in United States case law
California Democratic Party
Democratic Party (United States) litigation
United States Supreme Court cases of the Rehnquist Court